The Studentische Zeitschrift für Rechtswissenschaft Heidelberg ("StudZR"; English: "Heidelberg Law Review") is a law review published by an independent group of law students at Heidelberg University (Germany). It was established in 2004. To celebrate its 10th anniversary a symposium was organized in June 2014 under the patronage of the Baden-Württemberg Ministry of Science, Research and Art.

Content 
The journal comprises two separate publications with different objectives. The bi-annual StudZR Ausbildung print edition focuses on study-related topics such as case solutions based on previous law exams from Heidelberg University, essays concerning exam techniques as well as jurisprudence and textbook reviews. The StudZR Wissenschaft Online (WissOn) website includes classic legal articles, analyses of recent court cases and book reviews. Since 2012, the StudZR Heidelberg Law Review also manages an online blog with relevant news and updates.

Organisation 
The editorial board comprises around 50 law students, articled clerks, and post-graduate PhDs who manage the entire editing and publishing process as well as marketing and sponsorship functions. The journal is headed by an editor-in-chief, a chief of marketing and a chief of finance.

References

External links 
 
 StudZR Wissenschaft Online

German law journals
Law journals edited by students
Publications established in 2004
Heidelberg University